(born July 30, 1984) is a Japanese Nordic combined skier who has been competing since 2003. He won a gold medal in the 4 x 5 km team event at the FIS Nordic World Ski Championships 2009 in Liberec and earned his best individual finish of 27th twice (10 km mass start: 2009, 15 km individual: 2007).

At the 2010 Winter Olympics in Vancouver, Kato finished sixth in the 4 x 5 km team, 24th in the individual normal hill, and 30th in the individual large hill events.

Kato suffered a broken left arm after a fall while competing in the Nordic combined event during the Sochi Winter Olympic Games. After a seemingly successfully jump on the large hill, Kato's left ski came loose seconds after he landed, causing him to fall at high speed, sustaining the injury in the process. He was unable to continue in the competition, which would include a 10 km cross-country ski race.

References

1984 births
Japanese male Nordic combined skiers
Living people
Nordic combined skiers at the 2010 Winter Olympics
Nordic combined skiers at the 2014 Winter Olympics
Olympic Nordic combined skiers of Japan
FIS Nordic World Ski Championships medalists in Nordic combined
21st-century Japanese people